The Citizens' Action Party ( - PAC) is a Nicaraguan political party founded by the former legislative representative of the Sandinista Renovation Movement (MRS) in the National Assembly (1997-2001), Jorge Samper. After an ephemeral alliance with Alliance for the Republic (APRE) in 2005, the PAC is, as of 2006, part of the MRS Alliance.

References

Political parties in Nicaragua
Citizens' Action Parties